The 1948–49 Panhellenic Championship was the 15th season of the highest football league of Greece. The clubs that participated were the champions from the 3 founding football associations of the HFF: Athens, Piraeus and Macedonia. Panathinaikos won the championship, due to a better goal ratio than Olympiacos. The point system was: Win: 3 points - Draw: 2 points - Loss: 1 point.

Qualification round

Athens Football Clubs Association

Piraeus Football Clubs Association

Macedonia Football Clubs Association

 a.  Aris qualifies due to a better goal difference.

Final round

League table

Top scorers

External links
Rsssf, 1948-49 championship

Panhellenic Championship seasons
Greece
Panhellenic Championship